Cary Lawrence Condotta (born June 14, 1957) is an American politician from Washington. Condotta is a Republican member of the Washington House of Representatives, representing the 12th Legislative District Position 1 from 2003 to 2019. On May 1, 2018, Condotta announced he would be stepping down at the end of his 2017–2018 term, and not running for reelection in 2018.

Awards 
 2014 Guardians of Small Business award. Presented by NFIB.

Personal life 
Condotta's wife is Rebecca Condotta. They have one child. Condotta and his family live in Chelan, Washington, and later in East Wenatchee, Washington.

References

External links 
 Cary Condotta at ballotpedia.org
 Cary Condotta at ourcampaigns.com

1957 births
Republican Party members of the Washington House of Representatives
Living people
21st-century American politicians
People from East Wenatchee, Washington